Újbuda (lit. New Buda) is the 11th district of Budapest, Hungary. It is the most populous district of Budapest with 137,426 inhabitants (2008). Until the 1890s, Újbuda's present territory was a field south of the historical town of Buda. The construction of a new residential area started in the 1900s, the present district was formed in 1930. From 1880 to 1980, Újbuda's population increased from 1,180 to 178,960. There are boulevards, avenues with tram lines, and communist-era housing estates in the district. Line 4 of the Budapest metro passes through Újbuda.

Neighborhoods
 Albertfalva
 Dobogó
 Gazdagrét
 Gellérthegy (partially)
 Hosszúrét
 Infopark
 Kamaraerdő
 Kelenföld
 Kelenvölgy
 Kőérberek
 Lágymányos
 Madárhegy
 Nádorkert
 Őrmező
 Örsöd
 Péterhegy
 Pösingermajor
 Sasad
 Sashegy (partially)
 Szentimreváros
 Spanyolrét
 Tabán (partially)

Population 
 Ethnic groups (2001 census)
 Magyars - 91.4%
 Germans - 1.2%
 Others - 1.8%
 No answer - 5.6%

 Religions (2001 census)
 Roman Catholic - 47.1%
 Calvinist - 12%
 Lutheran - 2.8%
 Greek Catholic - 1.4%
 Jewish - 0.45%
 Other (Christian) - 1%
 Other (non-Christian) - 0.5%
 Atheists - 18%
 No answer, unknown - 16.6%

Transport
Traffic to Budapest from Western Hungary enters the city in this district; a main road, Budaörsi út is the direct continuation of motorways M1 and M7. Three bridges on the Danube are located in the district; the bridges Liberty, Petőfi and Rákóczi/Lágymányosi connect the district to the neighboring 5th and 9th districts on the Pest side.

Kelenföld Railway Station, the fourth largest railway station of Budapest is in the district. Most of the trains heading to Western Hungary and Western Europe pass through the station (including commuter trains to the agglomeration). The district also has a smaller station, the Albertfalva station.

Kelenföld Railway Station is also the terminus for Metro Line M4; the line, opened in 2014, is the first of the Budapest Metro to serve the district, where it has 5 of its 10 stations. It connects the district with Keleti Railway Station, the largest railway station in Hungary. Next to the Kelenföld Railway Station there is also a major bus station for local buses and another for buses serving the nearby towns.

The district has 46 bus lines, 9 night bus lines and 11 tram lines (among them Lines 4 and 6, two of the most important tram lines of the city, both of which have their terminus in the district).

There are no airports with scheduled flights within the district, however, it is home to Budaörs Airport, the pre-1950 main airport of Hungary. This was the second international airport in Budapest (after Mátyásföld Airfield), and the oldest still existing one, although today it serves general aviation only. During World War I one of the first military airfields, Albertfalva Military Airfield was located in the district, next to the first Hungarian airplane factory.

List of mayors

International relations

Twin towns – Sister cities
Újbuda is twinned with:
{|class="wikitable"
|- valign="top"
|
 Ruse, Bulgaria
 Prague 5 - Czech Republic
 Trogir - Croatia
 Vienna – Döbling – Austria
||

 Ustroń - Poland
 Bad Cannstatt  Stuttgart – Germany
 Sânzieni (Kézdiszentlélek) – Romania
||
 Târgu Mureş (Marosvásárhely) – Romania
 Trstice (Nádszeg) –  Slovakia
 Ada –  Serbia
 Cortona – Italy
 Berehove Raion – Ukraine

See also 
 Újpest
 Újpalota
 Újlipótváros

Gallery

Notes

References

External links
 Photographs